Elsted is a village and Anglican parish in the Chichester district of West Sussex, England. It lies within the civil parish of Elsted and Treyford. The village is on the Midhurst to South Harting Road 4.5 miles (7.2 km) west of Midhurst.

History
Elsted (Halestede) was listed in the Domesday Book (1086) in the ancient hundred of Dumpford as having 32 households: seven villagers, 23 smallholders and two slaves; with ploughing land, pasture and woodland for pigs, a mill and a church, it had a value to the lord of the manor of £15.

Parish church
The small parish church north of the crossroads, St Paul's, has a nave which had become derelict, leaving the chancel as the village church, until it was rebuilt in the 1950s. The surviving north wall is of Norman style herringbone stonework, with two round arched doorways filled in to make lancet windows.

Amenities
The village has one public house, and there is another at the former Elsted railway station at Elsted Marsh east of the village.

Notable people
Thomas Weelkes (1575-1623), composer and organist
Alwyne Michael Webster Whistler (1909–1993), British Army general
William Downes Willis (1790-1871), rector at Elsted until his death

References

External links

1867 description

Villages in West Sussex